Skage Simonsen Lehland (born 12 April 1998) is a Norwegian professional footballer who plays as a midfielder for Detroit City in the USL Championship.

Career

Early career & college
Simonsen played with SK Brann at youth level, before joining various lower league clubs in Norway, including Sandviken, Fana, Os TF, Krohnsminde (futsal), and Varegg.

In 2018, Simonsen moved to the United States to play college soccer at St. John's University. In two seasons in New York, Simonsen made 38 appearances, scoring nine goals and tallying ten assists. He was named Big East Freshman of Year in 2018 and All-Big East Second Team in both seasons. Simonsen transferred to Southern Methodist University in 2020, going on to score ten goals and add four assists to his name in 27 appearances for the Mustangs. He was named AAC First Team in both his seasons at SMU.

While at college, Simosen also traveled back to Norway during the summers to play with Lokomotiv Oslo, where he made six appearances and scored five goals in the Norwegian Third Division. In 2021, he played with fifth-tier US side NY Pancyprian-Freedoms.

Professional 
On 11 January 2022, Simonsen was drafted 69th overall in the 2022 MLS SuperDraft by D.C. United. He signed with D.C. United's USL Championship affiliate side Loudoun United on 8 March 2022.

On 13 December 2022, Simonsen was announced as a new signing for USL Championship side Detroit City FC ahead of their 2023 season.

References

External links 
 D.C. United profile

1998 births
Living people
Association football midfielders
D.C. United draft picks
Detroit City FC  players
Expatriate soccer players in the United States
Fana IL players
Loudoun United FC players
Norwegian expatriate footballers
Norwegian expatriate sportspeople in the United States
Norwegian footballers
Norwegian Third Division players
IL Sandviken men's players
SMU Mustangs men's soccer players
St. John's Red Storm men's soccer players
USL Championship players
Norwegian men's futsal players